Selker Noor is a lake in Schleswig, Schleswig-Holstein, Germany. At an elevation of 0 m, its surface area is 0.558 km².

Lakes of Schleswig-Holstein